Sergio Porrini (born 8 November 1968) is an Italian football coach and former player. A tenacious, reliable, and determined defender, he was known for his tactical versatility and work-rate, as he was capable of playing both as a full-back and as a centre-back, although he was usually deployed as a right-back, despite his lack of notable technical ability.

Porrini played for several Italian clubs throughout his career, although he is mostly famous for his periods at Juventus, and Scottish club Rangers, where he won several titles. He is currently an assistant coach for the Albania national football team.

Club career
After growing up in the A.C. Milan youth system (failing to appear for the first team, however), Porrini made his senior debut in 1989 for Atalanta, remaining with the club for four seasons, where he made his emergence. After attracting attention from larger clubs, he joined Juventus in 1993 for 11 billion Lit., featuring as a starter during the 1993–94 season under manager Giovanni Trapattoni. During the 1994–95 season, however, he had difficulty finding a place in the team's starting line-up under the club's new manager Marcello Lippi; due to Lippi's new three-man back-line, Porrini faced heavy competition from other defenders, such as Moreno Torricelli, and Jürgen Kohler, as well as back-up Massimo Carrera. In particular, Porrini was kept out of the starting eleven by the newly acquired Ciro Ferrara, whom Lippi had even moved onto the right flank in order to accommodate him into the team's new back-line. Despite his limited appearances for Juventus during the season, Porrini still proved to be decisive for the team: he notably scored two goals over both legs of the club's 1995 Coppa Italia Final victory over Parma, as well as a crucial goal in a 2–1 home win against Borussia Dortmund, in the second leg of the semi-final of the UEFA Cup, helping his team to reach the final of the tournament, where Juventus lost out to Parma; he captured his first Serie A title with the club that season. Porrini made 20 appearances for the club during the 1995–96 season, which saw Juventus capture the 1995 Supercoppa Italiana, but remained on the sidelines as Juventus celebrated their victory on penalties over defending champions Ajax in the 1996 UEFA Champions League Final. During the 1996–97 season, he made 40 appearances, due to Torricelli's injury, scoring two goals, one of which was the opening goal in Juventus's 6–1 away win over Paris Saint-Germain in the first leg of the 1996 UEFA Super Cup, helping the Turin club to win the title; Porrini picked up his second league title with the club that season. He also started in Juventus's 1–0 victory over River Plate in the 1996 Intercontinental Cup Final in Tokyo, and in the club's 3–1 defeat to Borussia Dortmund in the 1997 Champions League Final in Munich. Porrini eventually parted ways with the Turin side at the end of the season. Overall, Porrini made 87 league appearances for Juventus, scoring three goals, and 138 appearances for the club in all competitions, scoring five goals in total. With Juventus, Porrini won two Serie A medals, one Coppa Italia medal, and a Champions League medal during his four seasons with the team, as well as the Supercoppa Italiana, the UEFA Super Cup, and the Intercontinental Cup.

Porrini subsequently joined Scottish club Rangers in 1997, for £4 million and won two Scottish Premier League and Scottish Cup medals, as well as a League Cup title during his four seasons in Scotland. He started off his Rangers career at centre-back alongside Richard Gough but new manager Dick Advocaat soon moved him to right-back where he remained until he left the club in 2001. In total, he made 133 appearances for the club in all competitions, scoring seven goals, six of which came in league play in 80 appearances. He left Rangers to resume his football career in Italy at Alessandria for a season, later moving to Padova. After two seasons with Padova, Porrini joined lowly Pizzighettone in 2004 and retired after five full seasons spent with the small Lombardian club at Lega Pro Prima Divisione and Lega Pro Seconda Divisione levels, in 2009.

International career
While at Juventus, Porrini gained two international caps for Italy in 1993, under manager Arrigo Sacchi, appearing in two 1994 FIFA World Cup qualifying matches. He made his international debut in a 6–1 home win over Malta, in Palermo, on 24 March, and his second and final appearance with Italy came on 14 April, in a 2–0 home victory over Estonia, in Trieste.

Coaching career
After his retirement, Porrini agreed to stay with Pizzighettone as youth coach for a season, then filling a similar role at Pergocrema. In August 2011, he was then named head coach of Serie D club Colognese.

On 23 June 2012, he was named head coach of Serie D club Pontisola.

In 2019, he joined Albania national football team as an assistant to Edoardo Reja, whom he previously assisted at Atalanta.

Honours

Player
Juventus
Serie A: 1994–95, 1996–97
Coppa Italia: 1994–95
Supercoppa Italiana: 1995, 1997
UEFA Champions League: 1995–96
UEFA Super Cup: 1996
Intercontinental Cup: 1996
UEFA Cup (Runner-up): 1994–95

Rangers
Scottish Premier League: 1998–99, 1999–2000
Scottish Cup: 1999–2000
Scottish League Cup: 1998–99

References

External links
 

Living people
1968 births
Footballers from Milan
Italian footballers
Italy international footballers
Italy youth international footballers
Association football defenders
Serie A players
Serie C players
Scottish Premier League players
Scottish Football League players
Juventus F.C. players
Rangers F.C. players
U.S. Alessandria Calcio 1912 players
A.S. Pizzighettone players
Calcio Padova players
Atalanta B.C. players
Italian football managers
A.C. Ponte San Pietro Isola S.S.D. managers
UEFA Champions League winning players
Italian expatriate football managers
Italian expatriate footballers
Italian expatriate sportspeople in Scotland
Expatriate footballers in Scotland
Expatriate football managers in Albania